Khanag is a rural locality (a selo) in Khuriksky Selsoviet, Tabasaransky District, Republic of Dagestan, Russia. The population was 626 as of 2010.

Geography 
Khanag is located 7 km northwest of Khuchni (the district's administrative centre) by road. Rugudzh is the nearest rural locality.

References 

Rural localities in Tabasaransky District